NFZ may refer to:

 No-fly zone
 National Health Fund in Poland, Narodowy Fundusz Zdrowia